The men's tournament in volleyball at the 2004 Summer Olympics was the 11th edition of the event at the Summer Olympics, organized by the world's governing body, the FIVB in conjunction with the IOC. It was held in Athens, Greece from 15 to 29 August 2004.

Qualification

* The Asian Qualifier was combined with the 2nd World Qualifier. The first place team of the tournament qualified as the 2nd World Qualifier winners, while the best Asian team except the 2nd World Qualifier winners qualified as the Asian Qualifier winners.

Pools composition
Teams were seeded following the serpentine system according to their FIVB World Ranking as of January 2004. FIVB reserved the right to seed the hosts as head of pool A regardless of the World Ranking. Rankings are shown in brackets except the hosts.

Rosters

Venue

Preliminary round
All times are Eastern European Summer Time (UTC+03:00).
The top four teams in each pool qualified for the quarterfinals.

Pool A

Pool B

Final round
All times are Eastern European Summer Time (UTC+03:00).

Quarterfinals

Semifinals

Bronze medal match

Gold medal match

Final standing

Medalists

Awards

Most Valuable Player
 Gilberto Godoy Filho
Best Scorer
 Andrea Sartoretti
Best Spiker
 Dante Amaral
Best Blocker
 Aleksey Kuleshov
Best Server
 Andrea Sartoretti
Best Digger
 Sérgio Santos
Best Setter
 Ricardo Garcia
Best Receiver
 Sérgio Santos
Best Libero
 Sérgio Santos

References

External links
Official website
Final Standing
Awards
Results at Todor66.com
Results at Sports123.com

Men's tournament
Men's events at the 2004 Summer Olympics